Jacobus Johannes Uys (30 May 1921 – 29 January 1996), better known as Jamie Uys, was a South African film director, best known for directing the 1980 comedy film The Gods Must Be Crazy and its 1989 sequel The Gods Must Be Crazy II. Uys also directed the 1974 documentary film Animals Are Beautiful People.

Early life
Before his foray into film, Uys was a mathematics teacher in his hometown of Boksburg. He then married Hettie, a fellow mathematics teacher, and the couple started farming and opening trading posts along the Palala River. He was later appointed local magistrate and Justice of the Peace. In an interview, he stated, "Every Tuesday I crossed the wildest country and swam through rivers to get to the police post where I could hold court".

Career
He made his debut as a film director in 1951 with the Afrikaans-language film Daar doer in die bosveld. He directed 24 films. He founded a company with Tommie Meyer but later they split up.

Uys received the 1981 Grand Prix at the Festival International du Film de Comedie of Vevey for The Gods Must Be Crazy, and in 1974 he received the Hollywood Foreign Press Association award for best documentary for Animals Are Beautiful People.

Animals Are Beautiful People is about the plant and animal life in South Africa, Namibia, Botswana and Zimbabwe, especially desert creatures. A highlight of the film includes a scene with elephants, warthogs, monkeys and other animals staggering around after eating rotten, fermented marula fruit. Jamie Uys is credited with this legend of animals getting intoxicated on fermented marula fruits. In truth the amount of alcohol in the fermented fruit is so minuscule it could not cause intoxication without eating way more than the animals are physically capable of. The use of footage of drugged and drunk animals in this movie started this legend, the drugged animals being filmed in early experiments with the immobilizing drug M99 Etorphine and the drunk baboons had been fed fruit soaked in alcohol, also as an experiment:(https://www.youtube.com/watch?v=8MxNLg3rCdw).

Jamie Uys's most financially successful and well-known film is The Gods Must Be Crazy, a comedy first released in 1980. The film features a San hunter/gatherer named N!xau in the lead role. Its plot concerns a Coca-Cola bottle that was thrown out of an airplane, fell into the Kalahari Desert and was found by a San tribe. As this was the only "modern" object in their world, it led to strife and it was decided that the bottle had to be returned to the Gods, who must have sent it in the first place. The character played by N!xau was given the task to return it. The movie generated extensive word-of-mouth success in Europe, Japan and North America, with the movie rights initially being sold to 45 countries. It spawned a less successful sequel, The Gods Must Be Crazy II.

Uys had earlier made another film set substantially in the Kalahari Desert: Lost in the Desert, which tells the story of 8-year-old Dirkie Hayes's efforts to survive in the desert after surviving a plane crash, whilst his father Anton mounts increasingly desperate efforts to find him. As well as directing the film, Jamie Uys also played the part of Anton, and his son Wynand Uys played the part of Dirkie. Some early sources and credits name the director and actor of Anton's part as Jamie Hayes, and name Wynand Uys as Dirkie Hayes, but the relatively recent DVD release of the movie is attributed to their real names.

Uys's other well-known film was Funny People in 1977, which was a comedy in the same genre as Candid Camera in the United States, putting unsuspecting people in embarrassing positions. These included a talking postbox, with the voice of a man claiming to be trapped inside, who asks a passerby for help. When the passerby returns with his friends, the 'talking' postbox is silent, and his friends accuse him of being drunk. The sequel, Funny People II, was released in 1983, and features a young Arnold Vosloo who later found fame in Hollywood.

Uys loved the outdoors and to get away from the hubbub of Johannesburg where he lived. He had a modest A-frame dwelling at Paradise Beach (262, Die Heide St), a quiet coastal resort 5 km west of the surfers' paradise Jeffreys Bay (Eastern Cape). It was about 300 metres from the sea and for most of the years it had no electricity - only paraffin lamps and (later) gas lights. He at times would slip away to his favourite holiday retreat where he was seen collecting plant specimens, as a very keen amateur botanist who had his own herbarium. Uys would ride around on his bicycle to get to interesting spots in the veld. He also was a keen builder of model aeroplanes, on which he spent many hours during his Paradise Beach visits. In the late 1970s and early 1980s he had a luxurious house built on the beachfront, a couple of hundred metres away from his old A-frame.

Uys died of a heart attack in 1996 at the age of 74.

Selected filmography
 Daar Doer in Die Bosveld (1951) - Hans Botha
 Vyftig-vyftig (1953) - Hans Botha
 Daar Doer in die Stad (1954) - Hans Botha
 Geld Soos Bossies (1955)
 Paul Krüger (1956) - Younger brother
 Die Bosvelder (1958) - Hans Botha
 Rip van Wyk (1960) - Rip van Wyk
 Hou die Blink Kant Bo (1960) - Himself (uncredited)
 Hans en die Rooinek (1961) - Hans Botha
 The Hellions (1961) - Ernie Dobbs
 Lord Oom Piet (1962) - Piet Kromhout
 Die Wonderwêreld van Kammie Kamfer (1965) - Witch Doctor (voice, uncredited)
 All the Way to Paris (1966) - Igor Strogoff
 Dingaka (1965)
 After You, Comrade (1967)
 Die Professor en die Prikkelpop (1967) - Professor Hans Botha
 Lost in the Desert (Afrikaans version as "Dirkie": 1969; English version as "Dirkie Lost in the Desert" / "Lost in the Desert": 1969) - Anton DeVries
 Animals Are Beautiful People (1974)
 Funny People - Himself / Various voices (uncredited)
 The Gods Must Be Crazy (1980) - The Reverend (uncredited)
 Funny People II (1983) - Himself (uncredited)
 The Gods Must Be Crazy II (1989) - Bob (voice, uncredited) (final film role)

References

Further reading

External links

 

1921 births
1996 deaths
South African film directors
Afrikaner people
South African people of Dutch descent
People from Boksburg